In mathematics, the spectral abscissa of a matrix or a bounded linear operator is the greatest real part of the matrix's spectrum (its set of eigenvalues).  It is sometimes denoted . As a transformation , the spectral abscissa maps a square matrix onto its largest real eigenvalue.

Matrices
Let λ1, ..., λs be the (real or complex) eigenvalues of a matrix A ∈ Cn × n. Then its spectral abscissa is defined as:

In stability theory, a continuous system represented by matrix  is said to be stable if all real parts of its eigenvalues are negative, i.e. . Analogously, in control theory, the solution to the differential equation  is stable under the same condition .

See also 
 Spectral radius

References

Spectral theory
Matrix theory